The Men's singles competition at the 2017 World Championships was held on 29 January 2017.

Results
The first run as started at 10:29 and the second run at 12:38.

References

Men's singles